Basóvišča (pronounced ; Music Festival of Young Belarus) is the festival of Belarusian alternative and rock music, which is annually conducted by the Belarusian Association of Students since 1990.

The festival takes place during two July days in the Borak forest near Gmina of Gródek, Poland. The important part of the festival is the music contest, in which young bands compete for prizes - usually money and rights to record their album for free. Well-known stars of Belarusian, Ukrainian and Polish rock-scene usually perform there too. From five to twelve thousand people come to the festival every year.

History

2006
17th Basovišča was held on July 22–23, 2006. Contest was on second day. It was the first time when a band from Lithuania, IR, took part in it.

Contest results
Winners:
Parason - 40 hours of recording in Apollo Studio, and money (1800 zl)
S.D.M. - 25 hours of recording in Studio Rembrandt Radio Bialystok, and money (1200 zl)
Nevma - 1360 zl
 Ludzi śviatla - 1000 zl
Vodar suśviet - electric guitar

Other participants: Band A, Krok, RoStra, Termin X, Mozart

Bans 
In 2006, the organizers faced a ban on the concerts of “Adboryšča” (qualifying rounds for “Basovišča-2006”) in Minsk.

Criticism 
In 2008 Rock-Princess Kasia Kamockaja as a columnist over at naviny.by made such a takeaway on the festival, "„Basovišča“ was conceived not as a festival of Belarusian music in exile, but as a celebration of local Białystok Belarusians."

On the pages of BelGazeta, Tat'yana Zamirovskaya wrote in 2007 that the festival "is the only and oldest music competition in which young Belarusian rock bands can prove themselves and get a very significant prize."

In the retrospect of 2010–2019 in 2019, Lesha Gorbash from 34mag called the festival "a Mecca for Belarusian rock music." Oleg Klimov, editor-in-chief of Muzykalnaya Gazeta, described the festival in 2003 as follows: “Basovišča is a Belarusian Woodstock, only on the territory of Poland bordering Belarus. Therefore, no one knows about this fest, not only in the world, but even in the rest of Poland. In general, it is a cool festival of life.”

References

External links

  Basovišča — the official web-site

Belarusian music
Censorship in Belarus
Music competitions in Belarus